Sanna-Maija Wiksten (born 28 July 1980) is a Finnish former competitive figure skater. She is the 1998 Nordic champion, 1999 Nebelhorn Trophy silver medalist, and 1999 Finnish national champion. She reached the free skate at three ISU Championships – 1997 Junior Worlds, 1999 Europeans, and 2000 Europeans. She represented Tikkurilan Skating Club in Vantaa and Espoon Jäätaiturit in Espoo.

Programs

Competitive highlights 
GP: Grand Prix; JGP: Junior Grand Prix

References 

1980 births
Finnish female single skaters
Living people
Sportspeople from Espoo
21st-century Finnish women